Atila Emek (born 5 March 1947) is a Turkish lawyer, bureaucrat and politician from the Republican People's Party (CHP) who had served as the Member of Parliament for Antalya from November 2002 to June 2011.

Atila Kaya was appointed by Kemal Kılıçdaroğlu as the vice-chairman responsible for legal and electoral affairs on 18 August 2011.

See also
22nd Parliament of Turkey
23rd Parliament of Turkey

References

External links
 MP profile on the Grand National Assembly website

Contemporary Republican People's Party (Turkey) politicians
Deputies of Antalya
Members of the 22nd Parliament of Turkey
Members of the 23rd Parliament of Turkey
Living people
20th-century Turkish lawyers
People from Antalya
1947 births
Istanbul University Faculty of Law alumni